Schoenocaulon officinale, called sabadilla, is a species of flowering plant in the genus Schoenocaulon, native to Mexico, Central America, and Venezuela. It is highly toxic, containing veratridine, cevadine, and other alkaloids. Its seeds were used by pharmacists around the world to prepare delousing solutions and insecticides. It is still collected and used locally to rid domestic animals of fleas, ticks, lice and other parasites, and attempts are being made to revive the industry.

References

officinale
Plants described in 1840
Flora of Mexico
Flora of Central America
Flora of Venezuela